Hoplodoris grandiflora is a species of sea slug, a dorid nudibranch, a marine gastropod mollusc in the family Discodorididae''.

Distribution
This species is recorded from the Indo-West Pacific including Hawaii, the Philippines, Palau, Kerama Island, Mauritius, Tanzania and Madagascar.

References

Discodorididae
Gastropods described in 1860